25 to Life is a third-person shooter video game developed by Avalanche Software and Ritual Entertainment and published by Eidos Interactive for Microsoft Windows, PlayStation 2, and Xbox and released in 2006.

Set in a modern environment, the game allows the player to play as both a cop and a gangster, at different times, in a "cops and robbers" style game.  The game can be played online with up to 16 players using the network adaptor for the PS2 and through Xbox Live for Microsoft Xbox, and there is online play for the Windows version as well. On purchasing the Windows version, customers would also obtain a free, "Street Warriors" playing card which included a featured character from the game itself. These playing cards were exclusive, in which they were only included in the PC copies.

Plot
The game is about a man named Freeze, his friend Shaun Calderon, and police officer Lester Williams in the fictional city of Las Ruinas. Freeze commits crimes with Shaun to get money, which he spends for his family, while Williams is trying to stop the organized crime and across the city.

One night upon returning home, his wife confronts him about these actions. Saying they are a bad influence to their son, she wants him to stop. After an argument, he agrees. The next day, he tells Shaun he wants out of the game. Shaun levels a gun on Freeze, informing him that he must do one last job, a narcotics trade.

At the deal, Freeze finds the Colombian gang members dead and police officer Maria Mendoza waiting. Freeze flees with the police in pursuit and loses them. The 2nd Street D-Boys realize Freeze wants out of the gang and he has to avoid both his former gang and the police. Later, he robs a bank. After a gun fight against the police, he reaches his getaway car, only to be arrested after being hit by a nightstick.

Meanwhile, Mendoza informs Williams of Shaun. They look for Shaun in his house, but get caught in a gun fight. Williams finds evidence and goes to a club to find Shaun, chasing him to the subway. The chase ends with Williams arresting Shaun, but Mendoza kills him and tells Shaun to leave for Mexico.

Shaun goes to Tijuana and fights his way to a local club called "The Curtains Club". He robs a casino, fights security, and goes to a wealthy man named Saragosa in his penthouse, who he kills.

Freeze breaks out of jail and gets new clothes at the mall while being chased by the police. He kills Mendoza in the mall and hunts down Shaun, now a wealthy drug kingpin, eventually stepping on Shaun's neck until he suffocates. The final scene shows Freeze telling Darnell, "From now on, it's just you and me against the world. Now let's do this", as a large number of police officers arrive, with Freeze picking up a gun and pointing it at the police.

Reception

25 to Life received "unfavorable" reviews on all platforms according to video game review aggregator Metacritic.

Hyper'''s Maurice Branscombe commented that the game's soundtrack was okay only "if you like rap." However, he criticised the game as "absolutely unadulterated bullshit."USA Today gave the game a score of four stars out of ten and stated that its only strong quality "is a decent multiplayer mode. Most of the action is team-based, allowing you to choose between police or thugs. Players can choose to rob a location and return the stash to their home turf, raid a criminal hangout, or engage in an all-out deathmatch. Freeze's goal at the start of this story was to get out of the "game." Five minutes slogging through this shooter will have players wanting the same." The A.V. Club gave it a D+ and called it "a half-baked copy of someone's urban nightmare." Detroit Free Press'' gave the PS2 version one star out of four and stated that it "lacks everything that would make it new, innovative or just plain fun. The graphics are really muddy and sub-par. The controls seem to be a bit confusing."

References

External links
GamePolitics: Thompson Urges Injunction, Police Seizures of 25 To Life
 CNN's Showbiz Tonight Reports on 25 To Life

2006 video games
PlayStation 2 games
Windows games
Xbox games
Organized crime video games
Video games about police officers
Video games developed in the United States
Video games featuring black protagonists
Eidos Interactive games
Multiplayer and single-player video games
Video games set in New York City